NORPAC is a bipartisan, multi-candidate political action committee (PAC) working to strengthen United States-Israel relations, founded in New Jersey in 1982. Its activities include fundraising for Senators and Members of the United States Congress who support this relationship, regular emails regarding the situation in the Middle East, and the annual Mission to Washington.

Supported issues
Each year, before its annual Mission to Washington, NORPAC selects 5 issues or bills it will discuss that year, including:
Foreign Aid to Israel
IFSA, the Iran Freedom Support Act (H.R.282 /S.333 ), which imposes sanctions on Iran in response to nuclear activity.
USIECA, the US-Israel Energy Cooperation Act (H.R.2730 /S.1862), which supports joint alternative energy research.
PATA, the Palestinian Anti-Terror Act (H.R.4861 /S.2370), which restricts aid to the Hamas-dominated Palestinian Authority (while still allowing humanitarian aid) unless certain actions opposing terror are taken.
The Saudi Arabia Accountability Act (H.R.2037 /S.1171), which imposes sanctions on Saudi Arabia unless it clearly shuts down terrorist organizations within the country and ends support for such organizations outside the country.

Activities

Mission to Washington

Each year, NORPAC sends a group of active members to meet with Senators and Members of Congress to discuss the U.S.-Israel relationship. The mission in May 2009 brought approximately 900 participants to meet with more than four hundred Senators and Members of Congress, increase in the number of participants compared to previous years.

Political fundraising
NORPAC hosts fundraisers for various political candidates who are supportive of the U.S.-Israel relationship. It is the largest donor of New Jersey senator Robert Menendez, and regularly donates to various other politicians.

Organization leadership

National Officers

Regional Officers

See also
American Israel Public Affairs Committee
Political action committee

References

External links
NORPAC website

United States political action committees
Foreign policy political advocacy groups in the United States
Israel–United States relations
1982 establishments in New Jersey